Located in eastern India, Bihar is the twelfth-largest Indian state, with an area of 94,163 km2 (36,357 mi2) and an average elevation of about 150 metres above mean sea level. The landlocked state shares a boundary with Nepal to the north, the state of West Bengal to the east, Jharkhand to the south, and Uttar Pradesh to the west. Bihar lies in a subtropical temperate zone and its climatic type is humid subtropical.

Classification
According to the Köppen climate classification, Bihar's climate mainly falls under subtropical monsoon, mild and dry winter, and hot summer (Cwa), except for southeastern parts of the state, such as Jamui, Banka, Munger, Lakhisarai, Khagaria, Shekhpura, some parts of Bhagalpur, Saharsa, and Begusarai. The southeastern part of the state is located in an extreme that falls under tropical savanna, hot, and seasonally dry (usually winter) (Aw).

Seasons

Winter
Cold weather commences early in November and comes to an end in the middle of March. The climate in October and November is pleasant. The days are bright and warm. As soon as the sun sets, the temperature falls and the heat of the day yields to a sharp bracing cold. Cold waves, locally known as Sheet-lahar, bring in the sharpness in winter and drastically drop the temperature in Bihar, disrupting lives of millions of poor people and also causing several deaths. The temperature in winter all over Bihar varies from 0–10 °C. On 7 January 2013, in early morning, the mercury dipped to a record low of -2 °C in Forbesganj, 0 °C in Gopalganj, 0.2 °C in Jehanabad, 0.7 °C in Vaishali, -1 °C in Patna and Muzaffarpur, as well as other cities. December and January are the coldest months in Bihar.

Summer
Hot weather arrives in March and lasts until the middle of June. The highest temperature is often registered in May. Like the rest of northern India, Bihar also experiences dust storms, thunderstorms, and dust-raising winds during the hot season. Dust storms with a velocity of 48–64 km/hour are most frequent in May, followed by April and June. The hot winds (loo) of the Bihar plains blow during April and May, with an average velocity of 8–16 km/hour. The hot wind greatly affects human comfort during this season.

Rain (monsoon)

Monsoon season in Bihar is usually unpredictable and erratic.
It begins in mid-June and continues until the end of September.

Autumn (post-monsoon)
An important feature of the retreating monsoon season in Bihar is the invasion of tropical cyclones originating in the Bay of Bengal at about 12° N latitude. Bihar is also influenced by typhoons originating in the South China Sea. The maximum frequency of the tropical cyclones occurs in September–
–November, especially during the asterism called hathiya. These cyclones are essential for the maturing of rice paddies and are required for the moistening of the soil for the cultivation of rabi crops.

Statistics

Temperature

Precipitation

Weatherboxes

Disasters

Floods

Bihar is India's most flood-prone state, with 76% of the population in northern Bihar living under the recurring threat of flood devastation. According to some historical data, 16.5% of the total flood-affected area in India is located in Bihar, while 22.1% of the flood-affected population in India lives in Bihar. Floods in Bihar are a recurring disaster which on an annual basis destroys thousands of human lives, apart from livestock and assets worth millions.

See also
 1934 Nepal–Bihar earthquake
 Bengal famine of 1770
 Bihar famine of 1873–74
 Climate of India
 Climatic regions of India
 Geography of Bihar
 Golghar

References

Climate of India
Bihar